The El Dorado Carnegie Library is a former public library, constructed in 1912, in El Dorado, Kansas. It was designed by architect John F. Stanton. In 1959, a new library was built in El Dorado; the original was eventually purchased privately and in the 1980s it was renovated and converted into private offices: from 2002, an architectural firm. It was added to the National Register of Historic Places in 1987.

See also 
 National Register of Historic Places listings in Butler County, Kansas

References 

Library buildings completed in 1912
Buildings and structures in Butler County, Kansas
Libraries on the National Register of Historic Places in Kansas
Carnegie libraries in Kansas
1912 establishments in Kansas
El Dorado, Kansas
National Register of Historic Places in Butler County, Kansas